The Lagoon 35, also called the Lagoon 35CCC (Coastal Cruising Catamaran), is a French catamaran sailboat that was designed by Americans Morrelli and Melvin as a cruiser and first built in 1995.

Production
The design was built by Jeanneau's Lagoon catamaran division in France, which later became part of Construction Navale Bordeaux (CNB), now part of Groupe Beneteau. It was also built by TPI Composites in the US. Production started in 1995 with 11 built.

Design
The Lagoon 35 is a recreational sailing catamaran, built predominantly of fiberglass. It has a fractional sloop rig, with a deck-stepped mast, one set of triangular spreaders and aluminum spars with stainless steel wire rigging. The twin hulls have plumb stems, reverse transoms with steps, twin internally mounted spade-type rudders and a twin fixed fin keels. It displaces  empty and carries no ballast.

The boat is fitted with a Japanese Yanmar 1GM10 diesel engine for docking and maneuvering.

The design has sleeping accommodation for four people, with two cabins, each with a double berth aft. The galley is located on the port side amidships. The galley is "L"-shaped and is equipped with a two-burner stove, an ice box and a double sink. An "L" shaped settee and table are opposite the galley, on the starboard side of the salon. The head is located in the starboard hull.

See also
List of multihulls
List of sailing boat types

References

Catamarans
1990s sailboat type designs
Sailing yachts
Sailboat type designs by Gino Morrelli
Sailboat type designs by Pete Melvin
Sailboat types built by Jeanneau
Sailboat types built by Pearson Yachts
Sailboat types built by Construction Navale Bordeaux
Sailboat types built by Lagoon Catamaran